Félix Mory (born 20 March 1995) is a French professional golfer who plays on the Challenge Tour. He won the 2021 Dormy Open in Sweden.

Amateur career
Mory spent two seasons at Santa Barbara City College where he finished second at the Southern California Championship. He earned first team All-Western State Conference honors after finishing third in the conference, and was named Santa Barbara Athlete of the Year.

Mory transferred to California State University, Northridge in 2015 and joined the Cal State Northridge Matadors men's golf team. He was the Big West Conference Individual Champion 2016–17, First Team All-Big West 2016–17 and 2017–18, and Big West Men's Golf Player of the Year 2017–18.

Professional career
Mory turned professional in 2018 and joined the 2019 Pro Golf Tour, where he finished 8th in the Order of Merit to gain promotion to the 2020 Challenge Tour. In 2021, he won the 2021 Dormy Open after winning a playoff against Björn Hellgren.

Amateur wins
2012 Coupe Wallaert Devilder 
2013 Grand Prix Wallaert Devilder
2016 OGIO UC Santa Barbara Intercollegiate

Professional wins (1)

Challenge Tour wins (1)

Challenge Tour playoff record (1–1)

References

External links

French male golfers
Cal State Northridge Matadors golfers
Sportspeople from Nord (French department)
1995 births
Living people